Kahkashan Perween (born 1 January 1979) is an Indian politician from Janata Dal (United) she served as a Member of the Parliament of India representing Bihar in the Rajya Sabha, the upper house of the Parliament.

She graduated from Ranchi University in 1991 and has resided at Bhagalpur since her marriage. Rajya Sabha Chairman M Venkaiah Naidu nominated JD(U) MP Kahkashan Parveen to the panel of presiding officers for conducting proceedings of the House on 27 July 2018.

She was elected for a 6-year term which spanned from April 2014 to April 2020.

She presided over the question hour in the House on 3 August 2018.

References 

Janata Dal (United) politicians
1979 births
Living people
Rajya Sabha members from Bihar
People from Ranchi
People from Bhagalpur district
Women in Bihar politics
Jharkhand politicians
21st-century Indian women politicians
21st-century Indian politicians
Women members of the Rajya Sabha